Franko Kovačević (born 8 August 1999) is a Croatian professional footballer who plays as a winger for Domžale.

Club career
Born in Koprivnica, Kovačević grew up in the city of Križevci. At the age of 10, he joined the youth academy of Varaždin, before switching to Bjelovar a year later. According to him, he started taking football seriously and started "serious training" during his stint at Bjelovar. At the age of 15, he switched to the academy of Rijeka. After having spent one year at the club, he was called by German club Bayern Munich's manager Carlo Ancelotti to train with their team. In spite of the club expressing their interest in him, he joined fellow club Hajduk Split on 16 June 2018 and was promoted to the first team.

On 24 August 2017, Kovačević made his first team debut, coming on as an 85th-minute substitute for Hamza Barry in a 1–1 draw against English club Everton in the UEFA Europa League. On 3 March 2018, he made his league debut, coming as a substitute in a 1–0 victory over Rudeš.

On 15 February 2019, Kovačević was loaned out to Rudeš for the rest of the season. At the end of the season, Rudeš activated the option to sign him permanently for 300.000 €. However, a week after activating the option, he was sold to German club TSG 1899 Hoffenheim where he was supposed to play for the U23 team in the Regionalliga Südwest. Kovačević signed a 4-year contract with the German club.

FC Cincinnati (loan)
On 12 October 2020, it was announced that Kovačević would be loaned out to FC Cincinnati of Major League Soccer for the remainder of the 2020 season with an option to extend through 2021.

Pafos
On 5 August 2021, Kovačević signed with Cypriot side Pafos.

Domžale
On 12 August 2022, Kovačević joined Slovenian PrvaLiga side Domžale on a three-year contract.

Club statistics

References

External links

1999 births
Living people
Sportspeople from Koprivnica
Croatian footballers
Croatia youth international footballers
Croatia under-21 international footballers
Croatian expatriate footballers
Association football wingers
Association football forwards
HNK Hajduk Split players
HNK Hajduk Split II players
NK Rudeš players
TSG 1899 Hoffenheim II players
FC Cincinnati players
Pafos FC players
NK Domžale players
Croatian Football League players
First Football League (Croatia) players
Regionalliga players
Major League Soccer players
Cypriot First Division players
Slovenian PrvaLiga players
Croatian expatriate sportspeople in Germany
Expatriate footballers in Germany
Croatian expatriate sportspeople in the United States
Expatriate soccer players in the United States
Croatian expatriate sportspeople in Cyprus
Expatriate footballers in Cyprus
Croatian expatriate sportspeople in Slovenia
Expatriate footballers in Slovenia